The Johnstones was a ska punk band from Ajax, Ontario, Canada formed in 2002 and signed to the Union Label Group. In 2006, they signed to Stomp Records of Montreal, released the full-length album Word is Bond and began touring Canada and the U.S. Their video  'Gone for a Long Time' received 'buzz-worthy' status and gained heavy rotation on MuchMusic, staying on the charts for 8 weeks. In 2008, they released Sex, an E.P. produced by Flashlight Brown alumni Fil Bucchino and Matt Hughes. Ryan Long, Jarek Hardy along with 40-year-old Gary Kraft do a weekly podcast with thousands of listeners available free on iTunes. They are currently in the third season. As well, Long and Hardy have a side project called Tall Guy Short Guy. Mike Murphy was added to the band's lineup in 2009, allowing Long to be the front-man of the band, "to work the stage more, and to add more dynamics to the live show". 2009 also saw the release of a full-length CD called "Cant be Trusted". They released a DVD called "Get On Board" on April 30, 2010, and The "Gimmie your Love" EP in April 2010.

Discography 
Get On Board (2010)
Gimmie Your Love - Single (2010)
Can't Be Trusted (2009)
Can't Be Trusted – Single (2009)
Sex (2008)
Word is Bond (2006)
What the Rosstek?! (2004)

Videography 
Jenifer's Jacket (2012) 
Live Forever (2012) 
What's Your Problem Man? (2010) 
Gimmie Your Love (2010)
Take Me To The Party (2010)
GGGetcha (2009)
P.U.B. (2009)
Right To Say (2009)
Can't Be Trusted (2009)
Bank (2009) 
Last Chance (2008)
Tonight (2008)
Gone For a Long Time (2007)
Sunny Days (2007)

Members Side Projects 
Tall Guy Short Guy (created by Ryan Long & Jarek Hardy in 2009)
Rene Gillezeau (Solo Rap project created in 2008)
Ryan & Jarek TV (YouTube video/Podcast show created in 2008)

References

External links 

Canadian punk rock groups
Canadian ska groups
Musical groups from Toronto
Musical groups established in 2002
2002 establishments in Ontario